Nina Reithmayer (born 8 June 1984 in Innsbruck) is an Austrian luger who has competed since 2002. Competing in two Winter Olympics, she won a silver medal in the women's singles event at Vancouver in 2010.

Reithmeyer also earned a bronze in the women's singles event at the FIL European Luge Championships 2010 in Sigulda. Her best finish at the FIL World Luge Championships was sixth in the women's singles event at Oberhof in 2008.

References
 2006 luge women's singles results
 Austrian Luge Association profile 
 FIL-Luge profile
 Hickok sports information on World champions in luge and skeleton.

External links
 

1984 births
Living people
Austrian female lugers
Olympic lugers of Austria
Olympic silver medalists for Austria
Olympic medalists in luge
Lugers at the 2006 Winter Olympics
Lugers at the 2010 Winter Olympics
Lugers at the 2014 Winter Olympics
Medalists at the 2010 Winter Olympics
Sportspeople from Innsbruck
20th-century Austrian women
21st-century Austrian women